Marie "Bobbie" Dennis Poland Fish (May 22, 1900 – February 2, 1989) was an American oceanographer and marine biologist known for her bioacoustics research and the finding of eel eggs in the Sargasso Sea. Her research on underwater sound detection allowed the United States Navy to distinguish enemy submarines from wildlife. The United States Navy awarded her its highest civilian award, the Distinguished Service Medal, in 1966 to recognize her contributions during her twenty-two years (1948-1970) leading the "Underwater Sound of  Biological Origin" project for the Office of Naval Research. She also founded the Narragansett Marine Laboratory with her husband. It is now the University of Rhode Island's Graduate School of Oceanography.

Early life and education 
Fish was born in Paterson, New Jersey, and graduated from Smith College before earning a PhD from the University of Rhode Island.

Career 
Before working for the Office of Naval Research, she worked for the United States Bureau of Fisheries, Buffalo Museum of Science, New York State Conservation Department, University of Rhode Island, United States National Museum (now the Smithsonian Institution), Pacific Oceanic Biology Project, and the State of Rhode Island in various roles as scientist, researcher, investigator, instructor, and curator.

In 1925, Marie Poland Fish and her husband Charles John Fish, participated in the first oceanographic expedition of the New York Zoological Society (now the Wildlife Conservation Society), the Arcturus expedition, which was led by William Beebe. The six-month long expedition left New York on February 11, 1925, and sailed through the Sargasso Sea to the Galápagos Islands, returning to New York on July 30, 1925. Marie Poland Fish worked on samples from the expedition at least up to 1932. During this expedition she became the first person to identify the eggs of the elusive American eel. which reached the newspapers given the mystery surrounding the origin of eels. In a 1926 article in Science she first describes the collection of the eggs and their development into what she was able to identify as an American eel. In 1927 she published the full taxonomic description. She concludes her initial description by noting that

Fish's publications include work cataloging sounds from marine animals, including from fish and whales. She went on to determine the biological mechanisms that allow fish to make sounds. She was a prolific author, writing over 200 articles in academic journals and popular magazines, including a newspaper column on popular science that she wrote with her husband from 1936-1939, the only time they collaborated professionally.

Commemoration 
The Fish family endowed the Charles and Marie Fish Lecture in Oceanography, an annual public lecture on oceanography hosted by the University of Rhode Island's Graduate School of Oceanography that began in 1990.

Selected publications

Awards 
 Navy Distinguished Public Service Award (1966)

References

External links
The Charles and Marie Fish Lecture in Oceanography

1900 births
1989 deaths
University of Rhode Island faculty
American oceanographers
Women oceanographers
American ichthyologists
Women ichthyologists
Women marine biologists
American marine biologists
20th-century American women scientists
20th-century American zoologists
Recipients of the Navy Distinguished Public Service Award